Elliott County is a county located in the U.S. state of Kentucky. Its county seat is Sandy Hook. The county was formed in 1869 from parts of Morgan, Lawrence, and Carter counties, and is named for John Lyle Elliott, U.S. Congressman, Confederate Justice of the Kentucky Court of Appeals. In regard to alcohol sales, Elliott County is a dry county, meaning the sale of alcoholic beverages is prohibited everywhere in the county.

History
Elliott County was established in 1869 from land given by Carter, Lawrence, and Morgan counties. A fire at the courthouse in 1957 resulted in the destruction of many county records.

Geography 

Adjacent counties
 Carter County (north)
 Lawrence County (east)
 Morgan County (south)
 Rowan County (west)

Demographics 

As of the census of 2000, there were 6,748 people, 2,638 households, and 1,925 families residing in the county. The racial makeup of the county was 99.04% White, 0.03% Black or African American, 0.07% Native American, 0.01% Pacific Islander, 0.01% from other races, and 0.83% from two or more races. 0.59% of the population were Hispanic or Latino of any race.

There were 2,638 households, of which 33.40% had children under the age of 18 living with them, 60.00% were married couples living together, 9.70% had a female householder with no husband present, and 27.00% were non-families. 24.70% of all households were made up of individuals, and 11.00% had someone living alone who was 65 years of age or older. The average household size was 2.54 and the average family size was 3.02.

People of British ancestry form an overwhelming plurality in Elliott County.

In the county, the population was spread out, with 25.40% under the age of 18, 9.10% from 18 to 24, 27.50% from 25 to 44, 24.70% from 45 to 64, and 13.40% who were 65 years of age or older. The median age was 37 years. For every 100 females there were 95.20 males. For every 100 females age 18 and over, there were 93.50 males.

The median income for a household in the county was $21,014, and the median income for a family was $27,125. Males had a median income of $29,593 versus $20,339 for females. The per capita income for the county was $12,067. About 20.80% of families and 25.90% of the population were below the poverty line, including 30.50% of those under age 18 and 26.40% of those age 65 or over.

Politics 
Elliott County had voted for the Democratic Party's nominee in every presidential election since it was formed in 1869, up until the 2016 presidential election when it voted 70.1–25.9% in favor of Donald Trump. This was the longest streak of any county voting Democratic in the United States. It was also the last Southern rural county never to have  voted for a Republican in any Presidential election, until 2016. According to interviews from residents of the county, this overwhelming Democratic support was primarily due to love for tradition as well as an appreciation for big government following FDR's New Deal. Even in nationwide Republican landslides like 1972 and 1984, when Republican candidates won the state of Kentucky overall with over 60% of the vote, Elliott County voted 65.3% and 73.4% Democratic, respectively. Reagan, in particular, only performed 3% better in the county in 1984 than 1936 GOP nominee Alf Landon, despite the fact that Reagan won everywhere but Minnesota and Washington, D.C. and a national popular vote swing of 41%, while Landon lost every state but Maine and Vermont.

With white Americans making up 99.04% of its population, Elliott County was the second-whitest in the country to vote for Democrat Barack Obama in the 2008 presidential election, the whitest being Mitchell County, Iowa. Obama garnered 61.0% of the vote, while Republican John McCain received 35.9%. In fact, Elliott County provided Obama with the highest percentage of the vote in all of Kentucky. This made it the most Democratic county in the state for the second election in a row, since it had also been Democrat John Kerry's strongest county in Kentucky in 2004. Obama would again win the county in 2012, his only such victory in the staunchly conservative region of rural Eastern Kentucky. However, he eked out only a narrow 49.4% plurality over Mitt Romney's 46.9%, thus ending an over century-long streak of Democratic landslides in Elliott County. Reflecting the increasing rural–urban divide of modern American politics, Obama's strongest county in the state was instead Jefferson County, home to Louisville—the most populous city in Kentucky—which he won by a comfortable 54.7–43.6% margin.

Elliott County's hard swing towards the Republican Party continued in 2016, when it voted for Republican Donald Trump over Democrat Hillary Clinton by a 70.1–25.9% margin, decisively ending the Democratic Party's 140-year victory streak. Despite Trump's victory, Democratic candidates for down-ballot offices managed to carry the county. In the Senate race, Democratic nominee Jim Gray won 56.0% of the county's vote to Republican Senator Rand Paul’s 44.0%. He ended up losing the county in the 2022 election too. In 2016 Democratic State Rep. Rocky Adkins, a Sandy Hook native whose state house district includes the entire county, was reelected and took 86% of the vote in Elliott. Trump won the county again in 2020 with an even larger share of the vote than he did 4 years prior.

On Election Day 2012, Elliott County had the lowest percentage of registered Republicans in Kentucky, with just 215 of 5,012 (4.2%) registered voters affiliating with the GOP. By October 2016, this proportion had increased to 429 out of 5,213 (8.2%). In April 2019, it stood at 562 of 5,318 (10.6%). By June 2022, this share had nearly doubled, with 1,007 registered Republicans out of 5,243 registered voters (19.2%).

Communities

  Ault
  Bascom
  Beartown
  Bell City
  Bigstone
  Blaines Trace
 Bruin
  Brushy Fork
  Burke
  Clay Fork
  Cliffside
 Culver
 Devil Fork
 Dewdrop
 Dobbins
 Edsel
  Eldridge
 Fannin
  Fannin Valley
  Faye
  Fielden
  Forks of Newcombe
 Gimlet
 Gomez
 Green
 Halcom
 Ibex
 Isonville
  Little Fork
 Little Sandy
 Lytten
  Middle Fork
  Neil Howard's Creek
  Newcombe
 Newfoundland
 Ordinary
  Roscoe
  Shady Grove
 Sandy Hook (county seat)
 Sarah
 Sideway
 Spanglin
 Stark
 Stephens
  The Ridge
  Wells Creek
  Wyatt

See also

 National Register of Historic Places listings in Elliott County, Kentucky

References

External links
 The Year of Plenty, children's historical fiction set in Elliott County
 The Kentucky Highlands Project
 Elliott County Chamber of Commerce

 
Kentucky counties
Counties of Appalachia
1869 establishments in Kentucky
Populated places established in 1869